Thomas Cheadle (8 April 1919 – 4 September 1993) was an English footballer. He played for Port Vale in various positions for over a decade. It was his time as a "hard-man" centre-back, captaining some of the most successful Vale sides in the club's history, that made Cheadle a legend at the club. He helped the "Valiants" to win the Third Division North title and to reach the FA Cup semi-finals in 1953–54. He ended his career in 1959, following two years with Crewe Alexandra.

Career
Born in Stoke-on-Trent, Cheadle worked at Mossfield Colliery and in the local pottery industry before he joined the army. During World War II, in a battlefield in the Netherlands in 1944, he received a shrapnel injury after throwing a faulty grenade that nearly went off in his hand. At a rehabilitation centre, Cheadle spoke to Vale trainer Ken Fish, who told him to report to Port Vale after the war as the club may have a place for him. Playing in Army matches, Cheadle was coached by Matt Busby, who managed to secure a trial for Cheadle for Liverpool against Stoke City. Cheadle took the advice of Fish and came to The Old Recreation Ground and signed professional forms in March 1946 for £8 a week. He made his league debut in a 4–1 victory against Ipswich Town on 2 March. His first goal was against Southend United in a 2–1 win on 20 April.

Signing as a professional in May 1946, he spent the 1946–47 season playing across the back four, and also spent time as a centre-forward in a few games. He played 37 games in 1946–47, and scored his first goal in the Football League at The Old Recreation Ground in a 5–1 win over Reading on 2 November. For the 1947–48 season, Cheadle spent 16 straight games as a striker, scoring a patch of seven goals in seven games. He hit a total of eight goals in 23 Third Division South games in 1947–48. He scored twice in 23 games in 1948–49, before making 46 appearances as a centre-half in 1949–50 under the stewardship of Gordon Hodgson. Cheadle was one of the starting XI who played in the first match at Vale Park. He played 36 games in 1950–51, including a draw with Millwall on 28 October at The Den, a game which he played until the end despite breaking three teeth in a hefty collision. He featured 40 times in 1951–52, surviving Ivor Powell's brief reign to establish himself as a key part of new manager Freddie Steele's first team plans. He was an ever-present throughout the 49 games in the 1952–53 campaign, as the "Valiants" finished as runners-up in the Third Division North.

He was captain during the 1953–54 season, where Vale made it to the FA Cup semi-finals and won the Third Division North title. The team had conceded just 21 goals in 46 games with Cheadle at the heart of the 'Iron Curtain' defence consisting of Ray King (goalkeeper), Cheadle, Reg Potts, Stan Turner and Roy Sproson. In the semi-final clash with West Bromwich Albion at Villa Park he was dispossessed for the "Throstles" equaliser and gave away the penalty for Albion's winning goal. Cheadle featured only 26 times in the Second Division in 1954–55. He played 19 games in 1955–56 and 14 games in 1956–57, as the club suffered relegation under new boss Norman Low. His final game was a 6–0 defeat to Sheffield United on 25 March, a game in which Cheadle scored an own goal.

Now 38 years old, he moved to nearby Cheshire outfit Crewe Alexandra as a player-coach in July 1957. He played 37 league games for the "Railwaymen" as the club finished bottom of the Third Division North in 1957–58 under Maurice Lindley and 18th in the Fourth Division in 1958–59 under the stewardship of Harry Ware. He retired as a player at Gresty Road in 1959.

Style of play
Former teammate Roy Sproson said that: "Tom was quick and strong and nobody could beat him. Pound for pound, in fact, I would say Tom is the hardest man I have ever met." In fact he had 22 stitches in the head after various collisions with opposition players, his toughness earning him the nickname "wooden head" from his teammates.

Post-retirement
Following his retirement, Cheadle became a postman in Porthill. The pub at Vale Park was named Tommy Cheadle's in honour of his contribution to the club.

Career statistics
Source:

Honours
Port Vale
Football League Third Division North: 1953–54

References

1919 births
1993 deaths
People from Bucknall, Staffordshire
Footballers from Stoke-on-Trent
English footballers
Association football defenders
Association football forwards
Port Vale F.C. players
Crewe Alexandra F.C. players
English Football League players
British Army personnel of World War II